Attack of the Attacking Things is the debut album by American rapper Jean Grae. It was recorded at Da Crib of Hitz, H.A.H, and Project Heat Studios in New York City.

Critical reception 
Del F. Cowie of Exclaim! wrote that "this complex and rewarding release proves that [Grae]'s a dope emcee, period." Nathan Rabin of The A.V. Club called it an "auspicious, uncompromising debut" and praised its "depth and substance", while commending Grae for "using her outsider position to level a thorough critique of hip-hop's misogyny and materialism." Harry Allen of The Village Voice observed an "unpolished, handcrafted feel" and wrote "what it lacks in flam and polish, however, Attack makes up for with the determined and singular power of a compelling personal vision; something too frequently missing in the contemporary hip-hop that Black people are widely being paid off to make." The newspaper's Robert Christgau gave the album a one-star honorable mention, indicating "a worthy effort consumers attuned to its overriding aesthetic or individual vision may well like." He cited "God's Gift" and "Live-4-U" as highlights and quipped, "Props for both the Stylistics and *NSync—I like that in an undie rapper".

Track listing

Personnel 
Credits adapted from Allmusic.

 Evil Dee – engineer, mixing, producer
 Jean Grae – composer, primary artist, vocals
 Masta Ace – producer
 Block McCloud – engineer, mixing, primary artist, vocals
 Mr. Len – cut, producer
 Mr. Walt – producer
 Evan Price – producer

References

External links 
 

2002 debut albums
Jean Grae albums